2-hydroxyisoflavanone synthase (CYT93C, IFS, isoflavonoid synthase) is an enzyme with systematic name liquiritigenin,NADPH:oxygen oxidoreductase (hydroxylating, aryl migration). This enzyme catalyses the following chemical reactions:

 liquiritigenin + O2 + NADPH + H+  2,4',7-trihydroxyisoflavanone + H2O + NADP+
and
 (2S)-naringenin + O2 + NADPH + H+  2,4',5,7-tetrahydroxyisoflavanone + H2O + NADP+

Isoflavonoid synthase requires cytochrome P450.

References

External links 
 

EC 1.14.13